Borsod-Abaúj-Zemplén is an administrative county (comitatus or vármegye) in north-eastern Hungary (commonly called "Northern Hungary"), on the border with Slovakia (Košice Region). It shares borders with the Hungarian counties Nógrád, Heves, Hajdú-Bihar and Szabolcs-Szatmár-Bereg. The capital of Borsod-Abaúj-Zemplén county is Miskolc. Of the seven statistical regions of Hungary it belongs to the region Northern Hungary.

Borsod-Abaúj-Zemplén is the second largest county of Hungary both by area (after Bács-Kiskun) and by population (after Pest County). It is the only Hungarian county with two UNESCO World Heritage Sites (the Caves of Aggtelek Karst and Slovak Karst and the Tokaj Wine Region Historic Cultural Landscape).

Origins and meanings of name
The county bears the name of three historic counties of Hungary, each of them was centered around a castle.

 Borsod is named after the castle to which it belonged. The castle was possibly named after its first steward, Bors (in old Hungarian language the -d suffix was a derivation suffix for place names, thus the name Borsod means 'place belonging to Bors.') The name Bors itself is of Hungarian origin, derived from the Turkish loan word bors, which means 'black pepper / peppercorn' or a Slavic personal name Bor(i)š, Borša. The castle itself was a motte castle, and stood near modern-day Edelény.
 Abaúj is a shortened form of the name of its castle, Abaújvár. The Aba portion refers to the Aba clan which ruled the area in the Middle Ages, while új vár means 'new castle.' The castle stood near the village of Abaújvár.
 Zemplén is named after its castle as well. The name is derived from the Slovak word zem or the Slavic zemlja, meaning 'earth, soil, ground' or 'country.' The castle, like its name indicates, was a motte with earthen walls; its remnants can still be seen near the Slovak village Zemplín.

Note that besides these three castles, there were other castles in the old counties which became the modern Borsod-Abaúj-Zemplén, such as the well-known Füzérvár.

Coat of arms and flag

The county's coat of arms was created in 1991 from the coats of arms of the former counties now forming parts of Borsod-Abaúj-Zemplén. From left to right: Coat of arms of Abaúj-Torna county. – Coat of arms of Zemplén county. – Coat of arms of Borsod county. – Coat of arms of Gömör / Gömör-Kishont county (with its red background color changed to the same blue as used in the coat of arms of Abaúj).

The flag is vertically divided into two equal sections (red and blue), with the coat of arms on it, and the county's name embroidered with gold thread under the coat of arms. Its ratio is 2:1. The use of both coat of arms and flag is regulated by the county council.

Geography
Borsod-Abaúj-Zemplén is one of the most geographically diverse areas of Hungary. It lies where the Northern Mountains meet the Great Hungarian Plain, thus the northern parts of the county are mountainous – with some of the highest peaks and deepest caves in the country –, the southern parts are flat. The average temperature is lower than that of the country, the average humidity is higher (7–800 mm/year.) The region holds the country's record for lowest temperature:  on 16 February 1940 in the town of Görömböly-Tapolca (now Miskolctapolca.)

Rivers
 Tisza, which forms a natural border between Borsod-Abaúj-Zemplén and Szabolcs-Szatmár-Bereg countries
 Sajó, a tributary to Tisza
 Bodrog, a tributary to Tisza
 Hernád, a tributary to Sajó

Highest points
 Istállós-kő, Bükk Mountains (959 m.)
 Nagy-Milic, Zemplén Mountains (894 m.)

History
Borsod-Abaúj-Zemplén county was created after World War II from the pre-1938 counties Borsod-Gömör-Kishont, Abaúj-Torna and Zemplén (see also: 1950 Administrative Reform in Hungary).

From the Conquest until the Turkish occupation (900s–1526)
The historical comitatus (Hungarian: vármegye – "castle county", since each of them belonged to a castle) came into existence during the Middle Ages. Borsod county belonged to the Castle of Borsod, Abaúj belonged to the Castle of Újvár (in the modern village of Abaújvár) and Zemplén belonged to the Castle of Zemplén (today in Slovakia.)

At this time the area of Borsod also included the later county Torna, and Abaúj also included the later counties Sáros and Heves. In the 12th century the former Abaúj comitatus was split into Abaúj, Heves and Sáros counties, while Torna was separated from Borsod. For the next hundreds of years the borders remained unchanged.

About two-thirds of the areas of these counties were royal property, the others were ruled by clans, for example the Miskóc clan (after whom the city of Miskolc was named.) The area was inhabited mostly by castle serfs and foreign settlers (Pechenegs, Walloons, Czechs and Germans.) By the 12th century more and more areas were owned by noble families and the Church. Most of Borsod was ruled by the Bors-Miskóc clan, while Abaúj was the estate of the Aba clan.

By the 14th century most of the area was owned by oligarchs. To straighten his rule Charles Robert waged war against them. Palatine Amadé Aba (Genus Aba) was "de facto" ruler of Northern Hungary. Charles Robert betrayed and defeated Amadé in the Battle of Rozgony in 1312, and also gained power over Northern Hungary.

The differences between towns and villages became important during the Anjou age of Hungary. In Borsod and Abaúj the Free Royal Town of Kassa (today's Košice, Slovakia) and Miskolc emerged as the most important towns. The Castle of Diósgyőr had its prime under Louis the Great, it was one of the favourite residences of the royal family.

In the 16th century wine growing gained more importance. Today Tokaj-Hegyalja in Zemplén is one of the most important and famous wine districts of Hungary, home of the famous Tokay wine (named after the town Tokaj, the center of the wine district.)

From the Turkish occupation until the First World War (1526–1914)
After the battle of Mohács, as the Turks occupied more and more of the Southern territories of Hungary, the area of Borsod-Abaúj-Zemplén, as the northernmost part of the country, became an important area. After the Turkish occupation ended, and Hungary became part of the Habsburg monarchy, the area – because of its distance from Austria – was the main base of the resistance, and held this status until the Ausgleich ("Compromise"), when Hungary, formerly a mere province of the Empire, became an equal partner with Austria (1867). The family of Francis II Rákóczi (leader of the Revolution against Habsburg rule in the early 18th century) had estates here, and the revolution itself was organised from here.

The region also had cultural importance. The Reformation began its spreading in Hungary in this area, and the first Protestant college was opened in Sárospatak. Many of the important persons of the Age of Enlightenment grew up in this region, for example the important politicians Lajos Kossuth, Bertalan Szemere and László Palóczy, and the language reformer Ferenc Kazinczy.

During the 18th century several towns bought their freedom from their feudal landowners. New guilds were formed, manufactures were built, mines were opened, glassworks and forges were built. Miskolc began to catch up with Kassa and take over the role as the leading city of the region, and because of this Borsod was the fastest developing county of the three counties. Many foreign settlers arrived, Slovaks, Greeks, Germans, Russians – even today there are whole villages with significant number of them. According to the census of 1787 Borsod, Abaúj and Zemplén had almost 500,000 inhabitants.

After the Ausgleich Northern Hungary – just like the other parts of the country – experienced an era of prosperity and fast development. New factories, railway lines were built, the population grew. In 1882 Abaúj county was merged with Torna, and was renamed Abaúj-Torna.

Furthermore, a large population of Jews was established during this time period. The famous film mogul who created Paramount Pictures, Adolph Zukor, was born in Ricse, a town in this county.

From 1914 to today
After World War I and the Treaty of Trianon Hungary had to give up its northern parts to Czechoslovakia. Abaúj-Torna had to give up 48% of its area, 72% of Zemplén became part of Czechoslovakia, only Borsod remained fully within Hungary. The neighboring county of Gömör-Kishont retained 7.5% of its area, and remaining parts were merged with Borsod. The county seats were Miskolc (Borsod-Gömör-Kishont), Szikszó (Abaúj-Torna) and Sátoraljaújhely (Zemplén).

Under the First Vienna Award, arbitrated by Nazi Germany and Fascist Italy following the Munich Agreement, Hungary re-annexed territories that has been ceded to Czechoslovakia. During World War II Kassa was the capital of Abaúj-Torna. After Allied Victory in Europe, the pre-1938 borders were reinstated. The administration of the country needed to revert to pre-war status quo, since most of the land grabs proved temporary. Hundreds of thousands of Hungarians remaining in Slovakia were forcibly expelled. In 1950 the Hungarian parts of the former counties Borsod-Gömör-Kishont, Abaúj-Torna and Zemplén were united, forming the county of Borsod-Abaúj-Zemplén, with Miskolc being the county capital.

During the Socialist era the region was developed into the centre of heavy industry. Whole new towns came into existence in place of small villages (Tiszaújváros, Kazincbarcika), the industrial character of existing cities became more important (Miskolc, Ózd.) Urbanization was rapid, workers from all over the country were arriving in these cities and towns, and the population of Miskolc reached its highest level in the 1980s (around 211.000.) The end of the Socialist era and the recession of the 1990s hit hard, the unemployment rate is one of the highest of the country, and the local governments try to get over the crisis by strengthening the touristic potential. This seems to be a good idea, since Borsod-Abaúj-Zemplén is a geographically diverse area with rich natural and cultural treasures.

Demographics

In 2015, it had a population of 667,594 and the population density was 92/km2.

Ethnicity
Besides the Hungarian majority, the main minorities are the Roma (approx. 58,000), Germans (2,500), Slovaks (2,000) and Rusyns (1,500).

Total population (2011 census): 686,266
Ethnic groups (2011 census):
Identified themselves: 643,950 persons:
Hungarians: 576,814 (89.57%)
Romani: 58,246 (9.05%)
Others and indefinable: 8,890 (1.38%)
Approx. 89,000 persons in Borsod-Abaúj-Zemplén County did not declare their ethnic group at the 2011 census.

Religion

Religious adherence in the county according to 2011 census:

Catholic – 282,904 (Roman Catholic – 248,033; Greek Catholic – 34,816);
Reformed – 135,677;
Evangelical – 3,483;
other religions – 10,500;
Non-religious – 83,033;
Atheism – 5,821;
Undeclared – 164,848.

Regional structure

Economy
Due to the emphasis on industrialization during the former Socialist regime and the county's richness in brown coal, Borsod-Abaúj-Zemplén has become one of the leading industrial regions of the country, "the Ruhr Area of Hungary". The most important centres of heavy industry were Miskolc, Ózd, Tiszaújváros and Kazincbarcika. With the fall of the Socialist regime the industry faced a crisis, and Borsod-Abaúj-Zemplén is among the counties that have the highest rate of unemployment and also the lowest rates of GDP per capita in Hungary.

The county is the site of the Borsod Power Plant, one of the largest biomass power plants in Hungary.

Politics

County Assembly

The Borsod-Abaúj-Zemplén County Council, elected at the 2019 local government elections, is made up of 29 counselors, with the following party composition:

Presidents of the County Assembly

Members of the National Assembly
The following members elected of the National Assembly during the 2022 parliamentary election:

Municipalities 
Borsod-Abaúj-Zemplén County has 1 urban county, 27 towns, 8 large villages and 322 villages.

Borsod-Abaúj-Zemplén is the county of extremes: it is the home of the country's fourth largest city and second largest agglomeration, where one fourth of the county' population resides, on the other hand, the county is full of hamlets with population under 200. Borsod-Abaúj-Zemplén has 28 cities/towns (as of 2019) and over 300 villages. With a total of 358 cities, towns and villages this county has the most municipalities in Hungary. Approximately half of the population lives in cities/towns.

City with county rights
(ordered by population, as of 2011 census)
Miskolc (167,754) – county seat

Towns

Ózd (34,481)
Kazincbarcika (29,010)
Mezőkövesd (16,559)
Tiszaújváros (16,500)
Sátoraljaújhely (15,783)
Sárospatak (12,991)
Sajószentpéter (12,012)
Edelény (9,986)
Szerencs (9,198)
Putnok (6,905)
Felsőzsolca (6,613)
Encs (6,344)
Mezőcsát (5,980)
Alsózsolca (5,766)
Szikszó (5,631)
Nyékládháza (5,023)
Emőd (5,007)
Tokaj (4,530)
Szendrő (4,065)
Mezőkeresztes (3,886)
Borsodnádasd (3,169)
Abaújszántó (3,147)
Cigánd (2,963)
Sajóbábony (2,887)
Rudabánya (2,583)
Gönc (2,059)
Pálháza (1,061)

Villages

Abaújalpár
Abaújkér
Abaújlak
Abaújszolnok
Abaújvár
Abod
Aggtelek
Alacska
Alsóberecki
Alsódobsza
Alsógagy
Alsóregmec
Alsószuha
Alsótelekes
Alsóvadász
Arka
Arló 
Arnót
Aszaló
Ároktő
Baktakék
Balajt
Baskó
Bánhorváti
Bánréve
Becskeháza
Bekecs
Berente
Beret
Berzék
Bodroghalom
Bodrogkeresztúr
Bodrogkisfalud
Bodrogolaszi
Bogács
Boldogkőújfalu
Boldogkőváralja
Boldva
Borsodbóta
Borsodgeszt
Borsodivánka
Borsodszentgyörgy
Borsodszirák
Bódvalenke
Bódvarákó
Bódvaszilas
Bózsva
Bőcs
Bükkaranyos
Bükkábrány
Bükkmogyorósd
Bükkszentkereszt
Bükkzsérc
Büttös
Csenyéte
Cserépfalu
Cserépváralja
Csernely
Csincse
Csobaj
Csobád
Csokvaomány
Damak
Dámóc
Debréte
Detek
Dédestapolcsány
Domaháza
Dövény
Dubicsány
Egerlövő
Erdőbénye
Erdőhorváti
Égerszög
Fancsal
Farkaslyuk
Fáj
Felsőberecki
Felsődobsza
Felsőgagy
Felsőkelecsény
Felsőnyárád
Felsőregmec
Felsőtelekes
Felsővadász
Filkeháza
Fony
Forró
Fulókércs
Füzér
Füzérkajata
Füzérkomlós
Füzérradvány
Gadna
Gagyapáti
Gagybátor
Gagyvendégi
Galvács
Garadna
Gelej
Gesztely
Gibárt
Girincs
Golop
Gömörszőlős
Göncruszka
Györgytarló
Halmaj
Hangács
Hangony
Harsány
Háromhuta
Hegymeg
Hejce
Hejőbába
Hejőkeresztúr
Hejőkürt
Hejőpapi
Hejőszalonta
Hercegkút
Hernádbűd
Hernádcéce
Hernádkak
Hernádkércs
Hernádnémeti
Hernádpetri
Hernádszentandrás
Hernádszurdok
Hernádvécse
Hét
Hidasnémeti
Hidvégardó
Hollóháza
Homrogd
Igrici
Imola
Ináncs
Irota
Izsófalva 
Jákfalva
Járdánháza
Jósvafő
Karcsa
Karos
Kács
Kánó
Kány
Kázsmárk
Kelemér
Kenézlő
Keresztéte
Kesznyéten
Kéked
Királd
Kiscsécs
Kisgyőr
Kishuta
Kiskinizs
Kisrozvágy
Kissikátor
Kistokaj
Komjáti
Komlóska
Kondó
Korlát
Kovácsvágás
Köröm
Krasznokvajda
Kupa
Kurityán
Lak
Lácacséke
Ládbesenyő
Legyesbénye
Léh
Lénárddaróc
Litka
Makkoshotyka
Martonyi
Mád
Mályi
Mályinka
Megyaszó
Meszes
Mezőnagymihály
Mezőnyárád
Mezőzombor
Méra
Mikóháza
Mogyoróska
Monaj
Monok
Muhi
Múcsony 
Nagybarca
Nagycsécs
Nagyhuta
Nagykinizs
Nagyrozvágy
Nekézseny
Nemesbikk
Négyes
Novajidrány
Nyésta
Nyíri
Nyomár
Olaszliszka
Onga
Ormosbánya
Oszlár
Ónod
Pamlény
Parasznya
Pácin
Pányok
Pere
Perecse
Perkupa
Prügy
Pusztafalu
Pusztaradvány
Radostyán
Ragály
Rakaca
Rakacaszend
Rásonysápberencs
Rátka
Regéc
Répáshuta
Révleányvár
Ricse 
Rudolftelep
Sajóecseg
Sajógalgóc
Sajóhídvég
Sajóivánka
Sajókaza
Sajókápolna
Sajókeresztúr
Sajólád
Sajólászlófalva
Sajómercse
Sajónémeti
Sajóörös
Sajópálfala
Sajópetri
Sajópüspöki
Sajósenye
Sajószöged
Sajóvámos
Sajóvelezd
Sály
Sárazsadány
Sáta
Selyeb
Semjén
Serényfalva
Sima
Sóstófalva
Szakácsi
Szakáld
Szalaszend
Szalonna
Szászfa
Szegi
Szegilong
Szemere
Szendrőlád
Szentistván 
Szentistvánbaksa
Szin
Szinpetri
Szirmabesenyő 
Szomolya
Szögliget
Szőlősardó
Szuhafő
Szuhakálló
Szuhogy
Taktabáj
Taktaharkány 
Taktakenéz
Taktaszada
Tarcal
Tard
Tardona
Tállya
Telkibánya
Teresztenye
Tibolddaróc
Tiszabábolna
Tiszacsermely
Tiszadorogma
Tiszakarád
Tiszakeszi
Tiszaladány
Tiszalúc 
Tiszapalkonya
Tiszatardos
Tiszatarján
Tiszavalk
Tolcsva
Tomor
Tornabarakony
Tornakápolna
Tornanádaska
Tornaszentandrás
Tornaszentjakab
Tornyosnémeti
Trizs
Sárazsadány
Uppony
Újcsanálos
Vadna
Vajdácska
Varbó
Varbóc
Vatta
Vágáshuta
Vámosújfalu
Vilmány
Vilyvitány
Viss
Viszló
Vizsoly
Zalkod
Zádorfalva
Zemplénagárd
Ziliz
Zubogy
Zsujta

 municipalities are large villages.

Tourist sights

Castles
 Castle of Boldogkő
 Castle Cserépvár
 Castle of Dédes
 Castle of Diósgyőr
 Castle of Füzér
 Castle of Sárospatak
 Castle of Szerencs

Nature
 Dripstone cave of Aggtelek
 Bükk National Park
 Lillafüred

Gallery

International relations 
Borsod-Abaúj-Zemplén County has a partnership relationship with:

References and notes
References

Notes

External links
 
 Borsod Online (boon.hu) – The county portal
Official site deutsches office

 
Counties of Hungary